Pir Musa or Pir Moosa may refer to:
 Pir Musa, Gilan
 Pir Musa, Khuzestan
 Pir Musa, West Azerbaijan